FXP may refer to:
File eXchange Protocol
Franky Perez, American musician
FXP Preset, for Virtual Studio Technology
FXP (production company), the production arm of cable networks FX and FXX